The highest-selling albums in Japan are ranked in the weekly Oricon Albums Chart, which is published by Oricon Style magazine. The data is compiled by Oricon based on each albums' weekly physical sales. This list includes the albums that reached the number one place on that chart in 2014.

In 2014, a total of 43 albums claimed the top position of the chart. Beginning with dance and vocal group Sandaime J Soul Brothers's greatest hits/studio album, The Best/Blue Impact, issue dated January 6. AKB48's Tsugi no Ashiato was the best-selling album of 2014. The soundtrack, Frozen: Original Motion Picture Soundtrack, was the second best-selling album. With 980,000 copies sold, it became the best-selling animation film soundtrack album in Oricon history. Boy band Arashi's thirteenth studio album, The Digitalian was the third best-seller, with 785,000 copies sold.

Chart history

References

See also
2014 in Japanese music

Number-one albums
Japan
2014

de:Liste der Nummer-eins-Hits in Japan (2014)